Diego Sebastián Schwartzman was the defending champion, but lost to Martín Alund on the Second Round.
Uruguayan Wild Card Pablo Cuevas won the title over Argentinian Facundo Argüello, 7–6(8–6), 2–6, 6–4.

Seeds

Draw

Finals

Top half

Bottom half

References
 Main Draw
 Qualifying Draw

Copa Topper - Singles
2013 Singles